Stizocera pantonyssoides is a species of beetle in the family Cerambycidae. It was described by Zajciw in 1968.

References

Stizocera
Beetles described in 1968